The Eastern Rhaetian Alps  (Östliche Rätische Alpen in German, Alpi Retiche orientali in  Italian) are a mountain range in the central part of the Alps.

Geography 
Administratively the range belongs to the Italian region of Trentino-Alto Adige and the Austrian state of Tyrol.

SOIUSA classification 
According to SOIUSA (International Standardized Mountain Subdivision of the Alps) the mountain range is an Alpine section, classified in the following way:
 main part = Eastern Alps
 major sector = Central Eastern Alps
 section = Eastern Rhaetian Alps
 code =  II/A-16

Subdivision 
The range is subdivided into three subsections: 
 Ötztal Alps (DE: Ötztaler Alpen, IT: Alpi Venoste) - SOIUSA code: II/A-16.I,
 Stubai Alps (DE: Stubaier Alpen, IT: Alpi dello Stubai) - SOIUSA code: II/A-16.II,
 Sarntal Alps (DE: Sarntaler Alpen, IT: Alpi Sarentine) - SOIUSA code: II/A-16.III.

Notable summits

Some notable summits of the Eastern Rhaetian Alps are:

Notable passes

Some notable passes of the Eastern Rhaetian Alps are:
 Brenner Pass
 Jaufenpass
 Penser Joch
 Reschen Pass
 Timmelsjoch

References

Bibliography

Maps
 Italian official cartography (Istituto Geografico Militare - IGM); on-line version: www.pcn.minambiente.it

Mountain ranges of the Alps

Mountain ranges of Italy
Mountain ranges of Tyrol (state)
Landforms of Trentino-Alto Adige/Südtirol